Henri Benjamin Rabaud (10 November 187311 September 1949) was a French conductor, composer and pedagogue, who held important posts in the French musical establishment and upheld mainly conservative trends in French music in the first half of the twentieth century.

Life and career
Rabaud came from a musical background. He was the son of a cellist Hippolyte Rabaud (1839–1900), professor of cello at the Paris Conservatoire, while his mother was a singer who almost created the role of Marguérite at the request of Charles Gounod. His maternal grandfather was a well-known flautist, while his great aunt was Julie Dorus-Gras.

Henri studied at the Conservatoire with André Gedalge and Jules Massenet. In 1908, he became a conductor at the Paris Opéra-Comique where he later conducted the 100th performance of his opera Mârouf, savetier du Caire, and from 1914 to 1918 he directed the Paris Opéra. In 1918 he became musical director of the Boston Symphony Orchestra for only one season before returning to Paris. While in Boston, he was elected to membership in the Alpha chapter of Phi Mu Alpha Sinfonia fraternity, the national fraternity for men in music.

Following the resignation of Gabriel Fauré in 1922, Rabaud was his successor as director of the Conservatoire, where he remained until his retirement in 1941. Notable students during those years were Olivier Messiaen, Jean Langlais, and Jehan Alain. Staff included Paul Dukas and Jean Roger-Ducasse for composition, Marcel Dupré for organ, Marcel Moyse for flute, and Claire Croiza for singing.

In October 1940, he helped compile a dossier describing in detail the racial make-up of all Conservatoire students for the occupying forces.

Compositions
Rabaud's cantata Daphné won the Premier Grand Prix de Rome in 1894. His opéra comique Mârouf, savetier du Caire combines the Wagnerian and the exotic. He wrote other operas, including L'appel de la mer based on J. M. Synge's Riders to the Sea, as well as incidental music and film scores, such as the 1925 score for Joueur d'échecs (Chess Player).

Orchestral music by Rabaud includes a Divertissement on Russian songs, an Eglogue, a Virgilian poem for orchestra, as well as the symphonic poem La procession nocturne, his best known orchestral work, still occasionally revived and recorded. He also wrote music for chorus and orchestra and two symphonies.

His chamber music includes several works for cello and piano as well as a Solo de concours for clarinet and piano — a virtuosic competition piece written in 1901 for Conservatoire contests.

Conservative as a composer, he was known for his mantra, "modernism is the enemy."

Selected list of works 
Stage
La Fille de Roland. Opera (1904)
Mârouf, savetier du Caire Op. 14. Opera (1914)
L'Appel de la mer. Opera, 1924 (based on Riders to the Sea by John Millington Synge)
Rolande et le mauvais garçon. Opéra en 5 actes (1934)

Voice with orchestra
Job Op. 9. Oratorio (1900)

Orchestra
Divertissement sur des chansons russes Op. 2 (1899)
Procession nocturne. "Symphonic poem after Nicolas Lenau" Op. 6 (1899)
Eglogue. Poème virgilien Op. 7 (1899)
Orchestration of Fauré's Dolly Suite (1906)
Prélude et Toccata for piano and orchestra
Symphony No. 1 in D minor Op. 1 (1893)
Symphony No. 2 in E minor Op. 5 (1899)

Chamber music
String Quartet Op. 3 (1898)
Andante et Scherzo for flute, violin and piano Op. 8 (1899)
Solo de Concours pour Clarinet et Piano Op. 10 (1901)

Other
Incidental music for 'The Merchant of Venice', 1917 based on works by William Byrd, Giles Farnaby and others
Film scores for Le Miracle des Loups (1924) and Joueur d'échecs (1926)

See also 
 Le Miracle des loups (1924 film)

References

External links
 
 
 

1873 births
1949 deaths
Musicians from Paris
Lycée Condorcet alumni
French classical composers
French male classical composers
French male conductors (music)
French conductors (music)
French opera composers
Male opera composers
French film score composers
French male film score composers
Prix de Rome for composition
Conservatoire de Paris alumni
Members of the Académie des beaux-arts
Chevaliers of the Légion d'honneur
Directors of the Conservatoire de Paris